Travis Andrew Knight (born September 13, 1973) is an American animator, producer, director, and former rapper who has worked as the lead animator and current CEO for the stop-motion animation studio Laika, and directed the films Kubo and the Two Strings (2016) and Bumblebee (2018).

Early life
Knight was born in Hillsboro, Oregon, a suburb of Portland. He is the son of  Phil Knight (co-founder of Nike), and grandson of publisher William W. Knight. He attended Jesuit High School, near Beaverton, Oregon. He is a graduate of Portland State University.

Career

Music career
Knight began his career as a rapper under the name "Chilly Tee". Using a recording studio built in his father's mansion, Knight self-produced a five-song demo album. The demo caught the attention of Bernie Singleton, president of MCA, who passed the demo to producer Hank Shocklee, who liked the demo and agreed to produce Knight's debut album with his production team, The Bomb Squad.

Knight moved into his parents' Manhattan penthouse for six months while recording the album. The Bomb Squad helped him develop fleshed out choruses, as Shocklee felt that Knight was very skilled at writing verses, but his choruses were weak.

In 1993, Knight released the album Get Off Mine. According to Knight, the record did not sell well and he disliked performing. According to Shocklee, "One of the reasons why it didn't catch on was because it was one record that came out of nowhere, and rap is about building momentum." However, Shocklee is proud of the album, saying, "this record still holds up. You can play it now and it doesn't sound dated."

Animation
After Travis Knight graduated from Portland State University, Knight's father had become an investor in  Will Vinton Studios, and persuaded the company to hire Travis as an intern. He worked on the television series The PJs for Fox Studios and Gary & Mike on UPN, as well as television commercials and promo spots.

By 2003, Phil Knight became a controlling shareholder in Will Vinton Studios, and Travis Knight was promoted to the board of directors, despite having no management experience himself. Following the firing of Vinton, the Knights began to reorganize the failing studio, which was rebranded as Laika.

Since 2005, Travis Knight has served as Laika's vice president of animation. He was a producer and lead animator for Coraline (2009), ParaNorman (2012) and The Boxtrolls (2014). He also sits on the Laika board of directors. Along with Anthony Stacchi and Graham Annable, Knight was nominated for Best Animated Feature at the Academy Awards, for The Boxtrolls.

He is the current president and CEO of Laika, along with serving on the board of directors of his father's company, Nike, Inc., a position he assumed in 2015.

Directorial career
In 2014, Shannon Tindle pitched to Knight a fantasy project based on samurais, which Knight, a fan of fantasy films, approved for development. The film was announced in December, 2014, as Kubo and the Two Strings, while Knight was revealed to be producing and directing the film, marking his directorial debut. The film was released in 2016. Along with Arianne Sutner, Knight was again nominated for Best Animated Feature at the Academy Awards, for Kubo and the Two Strings.

On March 2, 2017, Knight was revealed to be directing the live-action film Bumblebee, a reboot of the Transformers film series, marking Knight's first time working on a live-action film, and his first time working in a film without acting as a producer. Knight, a fan of the G1 version of the franchise, used many elements from the G1 version in the film. Bumblebee was released on December 21, 2018, to a positive reception from both critics and Transformers fans, with many calling it the best film in the franchise.

In April 2019, he was set to direct an adaptation of Six Million Dollar Man starring Mark Wahlberg. In September 2021, Knight was announced to direct a film adaptation of Wildwood, with Chris Butler writing the screenplay. In April 2022, he was announced to direct a new Laika stop-motion neo-noir film titled The Night Gardener.

Personal life
Knight is married and has two children.

Filmography

Producer only

| Also animator
Animator only

Awards

References

External links

 

1973 births
American chief executives
American animated film directors
Stop motion animators
American animated film producers
Annie Award winners
Businesspeople from Portland, Oregon
Jesuit High School (Beaverton, Oregon) alumni
Laika (company) people
Living people
Musicians from Hillsboro, Oregon
Portland State University alumni
Rappers from Oregon
Animators from Oregon